Doomsday may refer to:

 Eschatology, a time period described in the eschatological writings in Abrahamic religions and in doomsday scenarios of non-Abrahamic religions.
 Global catastrophic risk, a hypothetical event explored in science and fiction where human civilization or life is at risk of partial or complete destruction.

Culture

Novels 
 Doomsday (novel), a 1927 novel by Warwick Deeping
 Doomsday, a novel in the Endworld series by David L. Robbins

Film 
 Doomsday (2008 film), a 2008 British film by Neil Marshall
 Doomsday (1928 film), a 1928 American romance drama silent film

Television 
 "Doomsday" (Doctor Who), a 2006 episode of Doctor Who
 "Doomsday" (Smallville episode), an episode of Smallville
 "Doomsday" (Hercules: The Legendary Journeys), an episode of Hercules: The Legendary Journeys
 "Doomsday" (The Office), a 2011 eighth-season episode of the American version of The Office
 "Doomsday" (Beavis and Butt-Head), episode 211 of Beavis and Butt-Head
 "Doomsday", an episode of the Super Friends
 "Doomsday", a first-season 1965 episode of Voyage to the Bottom of the Sea written by William Read Woodfield

Music 
 Doomsday (band), a heavy metal band from California

Albums 
 Doomsday (Boo-Yaa T.R.I.B.E.album), 1994
 Doomsday (Skinny Puppy album), 2001
 Operation: Doomsday, 1999

Songs 
 "Doomsday" (Atreyu song), 2007
"Doomsday" (Six Feet Under song from the album Commandment), 2007
 "Doomsday" (Vassy & Lodato song), 2018
 "Doomsday" (Architects song), 2017
 "Doomsday" (Nero song), 2011
 "Doomsday", a song by Impending Doom from Death Will Reign
 "Doomsday", a song by Mephiskapheles from God Bless Satan
 "Doomsday", a song by Overseer from Wreckage
"Doomsday", a song by MF Doom from Operation: Doomsday

Other uses in culture 
 Hearts of Iron II: Doomsday, a stand-alone expansion for Hearts of Iron II
Doomsday Zone, a level from the game Sonic & Knuckles
 Doomsday (DC Comics), a fictional character in the DC Comics Universe
 Doomsday rule, a way of calculating the day of the week of a given date

Other uses 
 Glenn Jacobs or Doomsday, Spanish-born professional wrestler
 Domesday Book (or the "Book of Winchester") is the "Great Survey" of England and Wales of 1086.
 BBC Domesday Project, a "survey" of children's daily life in the United Kingdom, made in 1986.
 BBC Domesday Reloaded, a web site for the digitised content of the BBC's 1986 Domesday Project.
 Doomsday Clock, a symbol that represents the likelihood of man-made global catastrophe.

See also 

 
 
 Apocalypse, another name for doomsday
 Domesday Book, the original 11th-century record of England
 Doomsday Book (disambiguation)